Guardador de Margens (Portuguese for River bank guard) is the third album by Rui Veloso, released in 1983.

Recording
The album was recorded between May and October 1983.

Track listing
All tracks were recorded by Rui Veloso and Carlos Tê with some exceptions.

Credits
Rui Veloso - electric and acoustic guitar, electric piano, blues harp and vocals

References

External links
Guardador de Margens at Rate Your Music

1983 albums
Rui Veloso albums